Clara Ponsatí Obiols (born 19 March 1957, Barcelona) is a Spanish economist and politician. She was appointed Minister Education of the Generalitat of Catalonia by President Carles Puigdemont on 14 July 2017, and was dismissed by the Spanish Government in application of Article 155 of the Spanish Constitution on the 27th of October 2017, due to the organisation of the 2017 Catalan Independence Referendum and the subsequent declaration of independence. On the 30th of October 2017, she went into exile in Brussels together with Carles Puigdemont and three other members of his government, Lluís Puig, Antoni Comín and Meritxell Serret. In May 2018, she returned to the University of St Andrews (Scotland) as a Professor. In the 2019 Spanish municipal elections, she was placed last on the list the list of the candidacy Barcelona és capital - Primàries, led by Jordi Graupera. Since February 2020, she is a Member of the European Parliament within the Junts i Lliures per Europa candidature.

Life and academic career
Clara Ponsatí was born in 1957 in Barcelona, Catalonia, daughter of Josep Maria Ponsatí i Capdevila and Montserrat Obiols i Germà. Her grandfather was the artist Josep Obiols i Palau, her uncle is the politician Raimon Obiols i Germà, and her sister is the Catalan philologist Agnès Ponsatí Obiols. She attended the Escola Talitha. In 1980, Ponsatí graduated in the Universitat de Barcelona’s Faculty of Economics, and she completed a Master in Economics in the Universitat Autònoma de Barcelona. In 1988 she received her Ph.D. in Economics from the University of Minnesota,where she remained some years as a professor. 

Ponsatí specializes in Game Theory and Political Economy, with a focus on models of bargaining and conflict resolution. In 2001, Ponsatí joined the Institute of Economic Analysis of the CSIC (Consejo Superior de Investigaciones Científicas) as a researcher and took its management from 2006 to 2012. She has also been visiting professor at the universities of Toronto, San Diego and Georgetown. 

In 2013, she denounced that the Ministry of Education, Culture and Sport decided not to renew her position as visiting professor of the Prince of Asturias Chair at Georgetown University because of her favorable position on Catalan independence and the right to self-determination, which Ponsatí considered a maneuver of "censorship" against her political opinions. Her views on the relations between Catalonia and Spain caused the Spanish Foreign Affairs and Cooperation Minister, José Manuel García-Margallo, to state: "una cátedra en el extranjero no debe servir de base para alentar procesos secesionistas contrarios a la Constitución", (This chair abroad should not be used to encourage support to secession movements contrary to the Constitution), remarking: "mientras yo sea ministro no ocurrirá en ninguna embajada española" (As long as I'm the Minister this will not take place in any Spanish embassy).

In January 2015, Ponsatí was appointed director of the School of Economics and Finance at the University of St Andrews in Scotland, her last academic post before taking charge in July 2017 of the Ministry of Education of the Generalitat de Catalonia.

Political activity 
From mid-2016 to July 2017, she was a member of the National Secretariat of l'Assemblea Nacional Catalana, just before being appointed as Minister of Education in the remodelling of the Government of the Generalitat de Catalunya carried out by President Puigdemont. From her Ministry, she participated in the organization and celebration of the 2017 Catalan Independence Referendum, which required the opening of schools as polling stations.

After being dismissed as Minister, and the Autonomy of Catalunya being suspended by applying Article 155 of the Spanish Constitution by the Spanish Government, on the 30th of October 2017 she went into exile in Brussels with President Carles Puigdemont and three other members of the Catalan Government, Lluís Puig, Antoni Comín and Meritxell Serret.

At the 2017 elections to the Parliament of Catalonia, Clara Ponsatí was elected member of the Parliament within the list of Junts per Catalunya,  but  she gave up her seat on January 2018 to guarantee the pro-independence majority in the investiture session. On the 10th of March 2018, she announced that she was leaving Brussels and moving to the United Kingdom to return to the University of St. Andrews as a Professor. 

In April 2019 Cara Ponsatí ran as number 3 on the list of Junts i Lliures per Europa for the elections to the European Parliament, headed by President Puigdemont. The candidacy won two seats, those of Puigdemont and Comín. Ponsatí could not become a Member of the European Parliament until the formalisation of the Brexit, when the new distribution of seats entailed the entry of Ponsatí to the European Parliament. 

Within the European Parliament, Clara Ponsatí is a member of the Committee on Industry, Technology, Research and Energy and of the Sub-Committee on Fiscal Affairs. She is also a substitute member of the Committee on Economic and Monetary Affairs, and participates in the Delegation for relations with Canada. In her plenary interventions, Ponsatí has denounced on numerous occasions the failure of the Spanish Government to comply with the Rule of Law in terms of civil and political rights and separation of powers, as well as highlighting that the European Union is not the Union of Peoples that it was intended to be.

European Arrest Warrants 
On the 24th of March 2018, the Spanish Supreme Court Judge Pablo Llarena launched a European Arrest Warrant against her, and Ponsatí's extradition proceedings commenced before Scottish courts.The Rector of the University of Glasgow, Aamer Anwar, was her defence attorney. On the 28th of March 2018, Ponsatí appeared before the Scottish authorities, who released her provisionally.  On the 19th of July, Judge Pablo Llarena withdrew the European Arrest Warrant against Ponsatí and against the rest of the exiled to Belgium and Switzerland after the German court of Schleswig-Holstein denied surrendering President Puigdemont to Spain for the crime of rebellion.

On the 5th of November 2019, Judge Llarena issued a new European Arrest Warrant to the United Kingdom against Clara Ponsatí based on the crime of sedition,  Initially, the UK police refused to process the European Arrest Warrant as it was deemed "disproportionate" under British law and it was requested that, in order to re-assess the decision, more information had to be provided. This created a diplomatic conflict and the United Kingdom eventually issued another document to state that deeming the warrant disproportionate had been a mistake. After judge Llarena sent the additional information requested by the British authorities, the United Kingdom agreed to process the European Arrest Warrant.

On the 14th of November 2019, Ponsatí gave a statement in Edinburgh before a Scottish court, who ended up dismissing the European Arrest Warrant in August 2021, when Ponsatí was already an MEP and was a resident of Belgium. Although Llarena did not withdraw the European Arrest Warrant, the Belgian police did not arrest Ponsatí nor did the Belgian courts open any proceedings, as she enjoys parliamentary immunity as a Member of the European Parliament.

Publications 

 Molts i ningú. Embastat de memòries i altres històries; Clara Ponsatí; La Campana, 2022

 The Case of the Catalans: Why So Many Catalans No Longer Want to be Part of Spain; Clara Ponsatí (Ed.); Luath Press, 2020

The stability of Multi-Level Governments; Enriqueta Aragonès; Clara Ponsatí; Barcelona Graduate School of Economics, July 2019
Meritocracy, egalitarianism and the stability of majoritarian organizations; Salvador Barberà; Carmen Bevià; Clara Ponsatí; Games and Economics Behavior, February 2015, 91:237-257
 Multiple-issue bargaining and axiomatic solutions; Clara Ponsatí; Joel Watson; Pub.: University of California, San Diego. Department of Economics; (Calif.) 
 L'endemà; by Clara Ponsatí& alt. ; Pub.: [Barcelona] Massa d'Or Produccions Coroporació Catalana de Mitjans Audiovisuals D.L. 2014
 Von Neumann i la teoria de jocs; Ponsatí, Clara; Pub.: 2010-03-11T09:25:00Z 2010-03-11T09:25:00Z 2010-02-24
 Robust bilateral Trade and Mediated Bargaining; Jernej Copic; Clara Ponsatí; Journal of the European Economic Association (2008) 6:570-580
 Bargaining over multiple issues with maximin and leximin preferences; Amparo M. Mármol; Clara Ponsatí; Social Choice and Welfare (2008) 30:211-223
 Bargaining one-dimensional social choices; Daniel Cardona; Clara Ponsatí; Journal of Economic Theory (2007) 137:627-651
 Economic Diplomamcy; Clara Ponsatí; Journal of Public Economic Theory (2004) 6:675-691
 Randomly available outside options in bargaining; Clara Ponsatí; József Sákovics; Spanish Economic REview (2001) 3:231-252
 Rubinstein bargaining with two-sided outside options; Clara Ponsatí; József Sákovics; Economic Theory (1998) 11:667-672
 Multiple-issue bargaining and axiomatic solutions; Clara Ponsati; Joel Watson; International Journal of Game Theory (1997) 26:501-52
 Mediation is necessary for efficient bargaining; Clara Ponsati Obiols; József Sákovics; Universitat Autònoma de Barcelona Departament d'Economia i d'Història Econòmica; Pub.: Barcelona Universitat Autònoma de Barcelona, Departament d'Economia i d'Història Econòmica 1992.
 El Finançament de les comunitats autònomes : comparació internacional; Clara Ponsati Obiols; Institut d'Anàlisi Econòmica.; Universitat Autònoma de Barcelona- 1990.
 Search and Bargaining in Large Markets With Homogeneous Traders; Clara Ponsatí;Publication: Contributions in Theoretical Economics, v4 n1 (2004/2/9);Pub.: Walter de Gruyter eJournals
 La financiación de la Comunidades autónomas : comparación internacional; Clara Ponsati i Obiols; Publication: Revista de economia publica, 1991, 12, pp. 65-10

See also 
 Andreu Mas-Colell

References 

1957 births
21st-century Spanish women politicians
Academics of the University of St Andrews
Education ministers of Catalonia
Exiled politicians from Catalonia
Fugitives wanted by Spain
Living people
Members of the 12th Parliament of Catalonia
University of Minnesota College of Liberal Arts alumni
Women members of the Parliament of Catalonia
People barred from public office
MEPs for Spain 2019–2024